K. S. Gopalakrishnan (born 1948) is an Indian carnatic flute player.

Early life
He was born on 1st September 1948 in Kerala. He first learned under his father Shri K. Sankaranarayana Iyer who introduced him to Carnatic classical music.

Career
Gopalakrishnan continued under Sri K. Raghava Variyar of Thiruvananthapuram. He has performed all over India and played on many music festivals. He won several awards including the Kerala Sangeeta Natak Akademi Award and the Veena Sheshanna National Award. He has a widely range of krithis and varnams. Gopalakishnan is well respected by many top musicians from India including Chitravina N. Ravikiran and N. Ramani. He was a staff artist at All India Radio Thiruvananthapuram.

Awards
 1999: Kerala Sangeetha Nataka Akademi Award

References

1948 births
Living people
Indian flautists
Carnatic musicians
Carnatic instrumentalists
Recipients of the Kerala Sangeetha Nataka Akademi Award